Colerain Township is one of the twelve townships of Hamilton County, Ohio, United States. The population of the township was 59,037 at the 2020 census. It is the second-largest township in Ohio by area, surpassed by Madison Township, Lake County, Ohio.

Geography
Located in the northern part of the county, it borders the following townships and cities:
Ross Township, Butler County - north
Fairfield - northeast
Springfield Township - east
Forest Park - east, between sections of Springfield Township
Cincinnati - southeast
Green Township - south
Miami Township - southwest
Whitewater Township - west
Crosby Township - northwest

The only municipality in Colerain Township is a small part of the city of North College Hill in the far southeast, but ten census-designated places occupy most of the township in the east
Dry Ridge, in the center, north of Northgate
Dunlap, in the north
Groesbeck, in the southeast, north of White Oak
Mount Healthy Heights, in the northeast, south of Pleasant Run
Northbrook, in the east
Northgate, in the center
Pleasant Run, in the northeast
Skyline Acres, in the southeast, also in bordering Springfield Township
Taylor Creek, in the southwest
White Oak, in the southeast
The unincorporated communities of White Oak, Groesbeck, Northbrook, and Northgate are all within the township.  White Oak is unique in its geography, in that it is part in Colerain Township and part in Green Township to the south.

The township is composed of 42.9 sq mi (111 km) of gentle wooded hills separating the Mill Creek and Great Miami River basins, sloping down to the flood plain of the Miami. The terrain generally rises toward the north of the township.  As of 1990, 29% of the township's land had been urbanized, and 15% developed as agricultural property, while half remained as woodlands.  The township is crossed by Interstates 74 and 275, while the main north–south artery is Colerain Avenue (U.S. Route 27).

Name and history
Statewide, other Colerain Townships are located in Belmont and Ross counties.  The village of Colerain was laid out in 1790 by surveyor John Dunlap, who was Scots-Irish and a native of the town Coleraine, in Londonderry County, Ireland (in what has since become Northern Ireland). Fort Coleraine, aka Dunlap's Station,  was one of the earliest attempts to settle the area despite the natives who had resided here for centuries without signing any land treaties.

The township was organized in 1794.

Government
The township is governed by a three-member board of trustees, who are elected in November of odd-numbered years to a four-year term beginning on the following January 1. Two are elected in the year after the presidential election and one is elected in the year before it. There is also an elected township fiscal officer, who serves a four-year term beginning on April 1 of the year after the election, which is held in November of the year before the presidential election. Vacancies in the fiscal officership or on the board of trustees are filled by the remaining trustees.

Colerain Township has a sister city arrangement with Obergiesing, a suburb of the German city of Munich.

Recreation
Clippard Park

References

External links
Township website
Northwest School District

Townships in Hamilton County, Ohio
1794 establishments in the Northwest Territory
Townships in Ohio